Jökulsárlón (literally "glacial river lagoon") is a large glacial lake in southern part of Vatnajökull National Park, Iceland. Situated at the head of the Breiðamerkurjökull glacier, it developed into a lake after the glacier started receding from the edge of the Atlantic Ocean. The lake has grown since then at varying rates because of melting of the glaciers. The size of the lake has increased fourfold since the 1970s.

The lake can be seen from Route 1 between Höfn and Skaftafell. It appears as "a ghostly procession of luminous blue icebergs".

Jökulsárlón has been a setting for four Hollywood movies: A View to a Kill, Die Another Day, Lara Croft: Tomb Raider, and Batman Begins, as well as the reality TV series The Amazing Race. In 1991, Iceland issued a postage stamp, with a face value of 26 kronur, depicting Jökulsárlón.

The tongue of the Breiðamerkurjökull glacier is a major attraction for tourists.

Formation

Lagoon 
Vatnajökull  was at the shore line of the ocean and dropped icebergs into the ocean. However, it started drifting inland rapidly every year, leaving deep gorges en route, which got filled with melted water and large chunks of ice. These icebergs gather at the mouth of the lake's shallow exit, melt down into smaller ice blocks, and roll out into the sea. In summer, icebergs melt and roll down the channel into the sea. The lake does not freeze in winter. Ice water and soil make a unique ecological phenomenon. Jökulsárlón Lake, the "glacier lake", is now reported to have doubled in size in the recent 15-year period. Some icebergs appear naturally sculpted on account volcanic ash from ancient eruptions that partly covers them.

Icebergs
The icebergs that calve from the glacier edge move towards the river mouth and get entrenched at the bottom. The movement of the icebergs fluctuates with the tide currents, as well as being affected by wind. However, they start floating as icebergs when their size is small enough to drift to the sea. These icebergs are seen in two shades: milky white and bright blue, which depends on the air trapped within the ice and is an interplay of light and ice crystals.

Glacier - Breiðamerkurjökull 
The outlet glacier that feeds the lagoon is called Breiðamerkurjökull. This outlet glacier is the only place in Iceland where a glacier meets the sea.

Out-wash plains - Breiðamerkursandur 
The glacier is responsible for the formation of a large outwash plain called Breiðamerkursandur. It has a breadth of around 25 km and serves as bird habitat in the summer month. This outwash plain is constantly changing. The shoreline of the glacial lagoon used to be advancing, but is now retreating as there is a decrease in glacial rivers depositing material. However, as the glaciers melt, the land rises around 2–4 cm each year somewhat balancing out the retreating shoreline.

Fauna

The lake is filled with fish that drift in from the sea along with the tides. Seals gather in large numbers at the mouth of the lake to catch fish during the winter. Large numbers of seabirds, particularly Arctic terns, which nest nearby, gather to catch herring, trout, salmon, krill and other fish. Breiðamerkursandur (the large sand deposits in the area) is the main habitat of the Arctic skua (Stercorarius parasiticus). During the summer season, the gull-like skuas have their nests on the lake's shores. The skuas, fat and dark in colour with white wingtips, are said to be aggressive "pirates of the seas", which harass other birds as big as gannets. They also kill and eat smaller birds such as puffins. Great skuas are not afraid of human beings and also do not tolerate human beings close to their nests. These birds are reported to migrate from their wintering grounds off the coasts of Spain and Africa. Seals are seen either swimming in the lagoon or lying on icebergs. Many times, the tides carry shoals of herring or capelan into the lagoon by the tide and the birds feast on them.

Land Use History

Land Settlement and Farms 
The first settlers arrived in Iceland around AD 870, when the edge of the tongue of Breiðamerkurjökull glacier was about  further north of its present location. When the temperatures rose between 1920 and 1965, the Breiðamerkurjökull glacier tongue rapidly retreated, continually creating icebergs of varying size, thus creating a lagoon in its wake around 1934–35. Glacial moraines became exposed on both sides of the lake.

Current Ownership 
In 2017 the Icelandic State bought the farm Fell which includes Jökulsárlón. Later that same year Fell and other public land surrounding Jökulsárlón got protected as a part of Vatnajökull National Park.

The Jökulsárlón Landowners Association represented the owners of the land property Fell. This property was leased out for filming or any other commercial activity as required.

Einar Björn Einarsson is the operator of the boat trips on Jökulsárlón. The Landowners Association leased out the site at the lagoon front to this operator to ply the boats on the lagoon.

Nature Protection 
Jökulsárlón and the surrounding area became a park of Vatnajökull National on 7 June 2008. The size of the park is 14,707 km2  Which is approximately 14% of Iceland, making it Europe's second largest national park in terms of area after Yugyd Va in Russia. On 5 July 2019, Vatnajökull National Park was inscribed as a UNESCO World Heritage Site. The unique qualities of Vatnajökull National Park are primarily its great variety of landscape features, created by the combined forces of rivers, glacial ice, and volcanic and geothermal activity. The National Park aims to preserve unimpaired the natural beauty of the park for the enjoyment, education, and inspiration of this and future generations.

Protective measures for the bridge
A coffer dam was constructed near the Glacial River Bridge that spans Jökulsárlón to build a row of protective measures of stone boulders to prevent any erosion of the foundation of the pillars of the bridge. This coffer dam enabled the Icelandic road administration to create workable access for the power shovel digger to place the row of stone protective measures, which would also divert the icebergs from hitting the bridge pillars, thus avoiding damage to the structure.

Given the current retreat rate of Vatnajökull,  likely a deep fjord will develop where Jökulsárlón is now. This retreat is also posing a threat to the National Highway Route 1 of Iceland. It is accessible by the ring road, Route 1, that goes across the lake, and where parking facilities have been provided for visitors. It is also known as the "tourist conveyor belt". Isolated large blocks of icebergs can be seen on the black sand beach, sometimes called "diamond beach" because of ice chunks scattered on the sand.

Tourism and Services

Activities

There are many activities available to guest at Jökulsárlón. There are lagoon tours provided by several different companies in boats or kayaks. In the winter there are ice cave tours that leave from the lagoon parking lot. There are hiking trails around the area that offer guests an opportunity to explore the area.

Boat tours on the glacier lake
In 1985, the premiere of the James Bond movie A View to a Kill marked the start of commercial boat tours on the lake. Guðbrandur Jóhannesson started the tours on Jökulsárlón. Jóhannesson, who today owns and operates the company Vatnajökull Travel, operated the tours for the first two years. In summer 1987, about 5,000 passengers sailed on the company's two small vessels. The next year, an amphibious vehicle, the LARC-V, joined the fleet. By 1995, the number of passengers per year had multiplied and the company then operated three amphibious vehicles. In 1999, Einar Björn Einarsson, a local from the nearby town of Höfn, bought the company. In 2006, the company added a fourth amphibian.

The company Jökulsárlón ehf now employs about 30 seasonal employees. For the past few years, the company has carried 60,000 to 70,000 passengers annually; since the first commercial boat tour, about 900,000 tourists have taken the excursion.

Services 
Jökulsárlón provides visitors with free parking and restrooms. There are park rangers working in the area all year round. During the summer months park rangers offer free educational walks for park visitors.

In popular culture

Jökulsárlón and the Breiðamerkurjökull glacier have been part of the James Bond films A View to a Kill (1985) and Die Another Day (2002), Batman Begins (2005), Beowulf and Grendel (2005), Lara Croft: Tomb Raider (2001) and Dilwale 

The popularity of the lake has been further boosted by the TV coverage provided live from Jökulsárlón on the American TV program Good Morning America in southeast Iceland, on 13 November 2006.
The live broadcast is reported to have been watched by four million people.

In 2014, Swedish electronic multimedia project, iamamiwhoami, filmed their music video "vista" in Jökulsárlón.

In October 2014, scenes of French singer Indila's music video "Love Story" were filmed at the lagoon.

See also
 List of lakes of Iceland
 Vatnajökull

References

External links

 Official Website of Vatnajökull National Park
 Information
 Jökulsárlón panoramic virtual tour
 Jökulsárlón | Long Day Tour
 Webcam
 Ice Cave Tour departing from Jökulsárlón

Glacial lakes
Lakes of Iceland